Hardcore Breakout USA – Volume 2 is an internationally distributed compilation album mostly of artists that are on New Red Archives records.  It was originally released in 1995 as a CD.  The album was compiled by New Red Archives. It is part two to the 1990 release Hardcore Breakout USA. The Japanese version Skaters Gear - 6, was compiled and released in 1995.

Track listing

Hardcore Breakout USA
Volume 2
Part 1
 "On A String" – Dogs On Ice 2:51
 "People Suck" – No Use For A Name 2:08
 "Hi Jinx" – Fizgig 1:13
 "Backsight" – Caffeine 2:36
 "Im Nobody" – Shleprock 3:42
 "Fill It Up" – Hogan's Heroes 2:14
 "Get Along" – Passed 3:12
 "With A Capitol P" – Rail 2:45
 "Darth Vader" – Fizgig 3:26
 "No Race" – Corrupted Ideals 2:20
 "Flicknife Temper" – Sanity Assassins 3:04
 "Cant Break My Pride" – 2 Line Filler 2:25
 "Cold" – Hogan's Heroes 1:55
Part 2
 "Messages" – Ultraman 2:34
 "Over The Edge" – Corrupted Ideals 1:54
 "La Mancha Candidate" – Ten Bright Spikes 2:45
 "Sky Flying By" – Samiam 3:54
 "Born Addicted" – No Use For A Name 2:36
 "Mineola" – Ten Bright Spikes 3:22
 "Its Your Right" – The Wretch 2:44
 "Fish People" – Christ on a Crutch 2:06
 "I Dont Care" – Corrupted Ideals 2:17
 "Self Destruct" – UK Subs 2:24
 "Acid Rain" – Reagan Youth 1:54
 "DMV" – No Use For A Name 3:08
 "Slow Stupid & Hungry" – MDC 1:09
 "Go Away" – Samiam 3:47
 "000,000" – Ten Bright Spikes 3:42

Reception

References

1995 compilation albums
1995 albums
Record label compilation albums
New Red Archives albums
Punk rock compilation albums
Hardcore punk compilation albums
New Red Archives compilation albums
Metalcore compilation albums